"Tripping" is a song by British singer Robbie Williams from his sixth studio album Intensive Care (2005). The single was released as the album's lead single on 3 October 2005 through Chrysalis Records. Backed with the track "Make Me Pure", also from the same album, it was sent to radio stations around the world.

Williams himself calls the song "something like a mini gangster opera" and "kind of cabaret act reggae". The rolling rhythm of the song owes much to the early work of the Clash. During the chorus Williams reaches an extremely high disco-like head voice. Lyrically the song is a bit darker than previous songs. It tells the tale of gangsters and how they "don't kill their own and they all love their mothers", before an anguished chorus of "I've taken as much as I'm willing to take". The opening lyrics "First they ignore you, then laugh at you and hate you. Then they fight you, then you win" is a paraphrase commonly misattributed to Mahatma Gandhi.

Upon its release, the song became a global hit, reaching number one in Germany, Italy, and the Netherlands. It peaked within the top five in more than 10 European countries, including the United Kingdom, where it reached number two and was the 19th best-selling single of 2005. It was also a success in Australia, reaching number seven on the ARIA Singles Chart, and peaked at number 20 in New Zealand.

Chart success
The song became a worldwide success for Williams, debuting inside the top 10 in most countries around Europe, including number two in the United Kingdom, spending six weeks inside the top 10 and 15 weeks inside the top 75. The single reached number one in Germany, Italy, and the Netherlands. The song also reached number one on the Eurochart Hot 100, becoming Europe's eighth-most-successful song of 2005. In Switzerland, the single was certified Gold for shipments exceeding 20,000 units. In Mexico, the song reached number nine and became the 11th most played track of the year. In Australia, "Tripping" peaked at number seven and went on to sell over 35,000 copies, being certified Gold by the Australian Recording Industry Association.

Music video
The video, which was directed by Johan Renck, features Robbie Williams running in place as if he can't seem to get anywhere. It appears that Williams is having a nightmare, in which he is living sometime in the 1950s, and is stuck running endlessly in a maze without ever advancing, or driving in a stereotypical 1950s backdrop. It also includes a baby singing to him some of the chorus, and a pair of lesbian twins in the backseat of his Saab 95. He also sees himself trapped in an elevator with a bigger guy in drag that proposed him to make out, he tries to defend himself but, at the end he allows him to be touched, and at that moment, Williams wakes up, smiles and close his eyes.

Track listings

UK CD1 and European CD single
 "Tripping" (album version)
 "Make Me Pure" (edit)

UK CD2
 "Tripping" (album version)
 "Make Me Pure" (edit)
 "Meet the Stars"
 "Tripping" (video)
 Picture gallery

UK DVD single
 "Tripping" (video)
 "Make Me Pure" (video)
 "Bag Full of Silly" (audio)
 Video clip and photo gallery

Australian CD single
 "Tripping" (album version)
 "Make Me Pure" (edit)
 "Meet the Stars"

Credits and personnel
Credits are taken from the Intensive Care album booklet.

Studios
 Recorded between June 2003 and May 2005 at Air Studios, The Townhouse (London, England), Rockband East and West, and Henson Studios (Los Angeles)
 Mixed at Mix This! (Pacific Palisades, Los Angeles)
 Strings engineered at NRG (North Hollywood, California)
 Mastered at Metropolis Mastering (London, England)

Personnel

 Robbie Williams – writing, lead vocals, backing vocals, Fender Jazz Bass guitar, production
 Stephen Duffy – writing, Fender Stratocaster guitar, Korg keyboard, Hobner melodica, glockenspiel, production
 Claire Worrall – backing vocals, Wurlitzer
 Jerry Meehan – Fender Precision Bass guitar
 Matt Chamberlain – drums
 Max Beesley – percussion, vibes, Waldorf synthesiser
 Steve Sidwell – trumpet
 Neil Sidwell – trombone
 Dave Bishop – saxophone
 David Campbell – string arrangement, conducting
 Allen Sides – string engineering
 Bob Clearmountain – mixing
 Tony Cousins – mastering

Charts

Weekly charts

Year-end charts

Certifications and sales

Release history

References

External links
 Virgin Single Review - last accessed on 6 November 2005.
 Robbie Williams Info - Singles - last accessed on 7 November 2005.

2005 singles
2005 songs
Dutch Top 40 number-one singles
European Hot 100 Singles number-one singles
Music videos directed by Johan Renck
Number-one singles in Italy
Number-one singles in Germany
Robbie Williams songs
Songs written by Robbie Williams
Songs written by Stephen Duffy